The 1976–77 season was Sport Lisboa e Benfica's 73rd season in existence and the club's 43rd consecutive season in the top flight of Portuguese football, covering the period from 1 July 1976 to 30 June 1977. Benfica competed domestically in the Primeira Divisão and the Taça de Portugal, and participated in the European Cup after winning the previous league.

In the new season, Benfica replaced league-winner, Mário Wilson by a foreigner. After a long saga, John Mortimore was chosen. In  the transfer window, the club added Pietra and Carlos Alhinho and sold Rui Jordão. A complicated pre-season predicted a troubled start. In September, Benfica lost in the opening round with Sporting and drew the next two with Estoril Praia and Académica de Coimbra. At the same time, they were eliminated from the European Cup by Dynamo Dresden without scoring a goal. In October, another loss, now with Boavista, with Benfica sitting in 13th place, six points from the top. However, they managed to turn it around and won the following six matches. In January, while his rival Sporting was dropping points, Benfica gained five points and reduce their deficit to one. They passed them in February and despite a loss for the Portuguese Cup against them, Benfica kept on winning in the Primeira Divisão. Two away draws did not cause harm with Benfica finally securing their third title in a row in early May. It was their 14th title since 1960.

Season summary
In the off-season, Benfica changed managers again. After guiding Benfica to their 22nd league title, Mário Wilson contract was not renewed and he moved to Boavista. His assistant Fernando Cabrita followed him. The press speculated on various names, such as John Mortimore, Bill McGarry and Dario Gradi. Signing a British manager was an obvious goal, and Gradi was first choice, landing in Lisbon on 22 June to discuss terms. However, he left the following day, as Director of Football, Romão Martins, and also several key players did not approve him. As alternative, Benfica thought of Peres Bandeira, who days before was offered the job of assistant to Gradi. An offer he rejected. Without manager, Benfica started their pre-season on 2 July with assistant Rui Silva in charge. At that point, the possible choices were either a Portuguese managers like Peres Bandeira and José Augusto or foreigners like Aymoré Moreira and Miguel Muñoz. Six days later, players agreed that a foreign manager was the best option and on 10 July, John Mortimore was selected. He arrived on 12 July to discuss his contract, which he signed a day later. He took over the team on 26 July. Contrasting with the troubled signing of a manager, Benfica made very few squad adjustments, notably just Pietra and later Carlos Alhinho.  Biggest departure was Rui Jordão, who finally had his move to Spain. Benfica's first preparation games were in Brazil on 13 and 15 August, with the team competing in the Trofeo Cidade de Vigo shortly after. The pre-season ended with two games in Cameroon. After three losses in the preparation games, Toni worriedly said: "I am afraid of this team. The members will demand the league, but...".

The league began on 4 September with a visit to Estádio de Alvalade to play Sporting, with Benfica losing 3–0. A week later, another poor result in a home draw with Braga. On the opening night of the European Cup, Benfica lost to Dynamo Dresden by 2–0. A confident Mortimore predict the return leg: "70,000 fans will score one and the team will score two". On 19 September, Benfica visited Estádio António Coimbra da Mota to play Estoril Praia, dropping another point in a 1–1 draw, putting them in the 14th place. The first win only arrived a week later, with Académica de Coimbra at home. The first month of the season ended with a home draw with Dresden, which eliminated Benfica on the first round. Going out in the first round of the European Cup without scoring was unprecedented until then. October began with a game on the road against Vitória de Setúbal, which Benfica lost by 2–1. This put the team in 13th place, six points away from leaders Sporting. Mortimore was feeling the pressure and his work began to be questioned. Romão Martins responded with "With Hagan in 1970–71, we were six points from first place at match-day 15 and still won the league...". An members meet was also brought up to discuss the club signing policy, which blocked signing foreigners. It was rejected. Nonetheless, Benfica performance improved and with a win against Boavista, they started a winning run that extended until January. However, this wins did not reduce the distance to top, as Sporting kept a five-point lead.

With a draw on 5 January, against Eusébio's Beira-Mar, that distance returned to six points. In the following two match-days, Sporting first lost with Setúbal, and then drew with Boavista, while Benfica won both matches, thus reducing the distance between them to three points. Sporting with 26 and Benfica with 23 points. On the final match in January, Benfica beat Sporting by 2–1 at home and cut the distance to a single point. Two weeks later, both teams were level at the top, when Benfica beat Estoril Praia and Sporting drew with Portimonense. Benfica concluded the month by taking the first place from Sporting, with a win in Coimbra against Académica, while his rivals drew at home. In March, Benfica visited Alvalade for the round of 16 of the Portuguese Cup, losing three-nil with a hat-trick from Manoel. In the Primeira Divisão, on 20 March, Benfica beat Boavista in Estádio do Bessa and secured their ninth consecutive league win. They were stopped in the following week, when they drew in Estádio do Restelo with Belenenses. Due to Sporting's loss at home with Porto, Benfica gained a point over his rival. They had 36 and a three-point lead. Benfica would drop points again on 17 April, in a 1–1 draw against Vitória de Guimarães, but it did not harm their lead, as Sporting also drew in the same weekend. Three weeks later, on match-day 27, Benfica beat Beira-Mar by 4–0 and confirmed their 23rd league title. It was their six title in seven years, and their 14th in 18 years, broken down to a back-to-back and four three-in a row wins. Nené played all 30 matches and scored 23 goals, after being moved from right-winger to striker, due to the lack of quality options in that position. The 24 goals conceded by the team was also a league best.

Competitions

Overall record

Primeira Divisão

League table

Results by round

Matches

Taça de Portugal

European Cup

First round

Taça Federação Portuguesa de Futebol

Friendlies

Player statistics
The squad for the season consisted of the players listed in the tables below, as well as staff member John Mortimore (manager), Rui Silva (assistant manager).

Transfers

In

In by loan

Out

Out by loan

Notes

References

Bibliography
 
 
 

S.L. Benfica seasons
Benfica
Portuguese football championship-winning seasons